5 Canum Venaticorum is a probable binary star system in the northern constellation of Canes Venatici, located about 375 light years from the Sun. It is visible to the naked eye as a faint, yellow-hued star with an apparent visual magnitude of +4.77. The system is moving closer to the Earth with a heliocentric radial velocity of −14 km/s.

The 'Ba0.3' suffix notation indicates this is a mild barium star, which means that the stellar atmosphere has been enhanced by s-process elements most likely provided by what is now an orbiting white dwarf companion. The primary is 530 million years old with 2.96 times the mass of the Sun and has expanded to about 12 times the Sun's radius. It is radiating 174 times the Sun's luminosity from its enlarged photosphere at an effective temperature of 5,098 K.

In Chinese astronomy, 5 Canum Venaticorum is called 相, Pinyin: Xiāng, meaning Prime Minister, because this star is marking itself and stand alone in Prime Minister asterism, Purple Forbidden enclosure mansion (see : Chinese constellation).

References

G-type giants
Barium stars
Binary stars
Canum Venaticorum, 05
Canes Venatici
BD+52 1626
107950
060485
4716